Statistics from the 2014–15 Provo Premier League:

Table 

Mango Reef Trailblazers and Flamingo withdrew during the season.

References 

Provo Premier League
Turks